

History 
Palashbari S.M Model Pilot Govt. High School is located at Palashbari Upazila in Gaibandha District, Bangladesh. It a combined school that means boys and girls both can continue their study here .

It is a very redounded school among the schools in Gaibandha District .   It was founded in 1911.

Donars of the School

References 

High schools in Bangladesh
Educational institutions established in 1911
1911 establishments in India
Schools in Gaibandha District